Adam Gondvi (born Ram Nath Singh; 22 October 1947 – 18 December 2011) was an Indian poet from Atta Paraspur, Gonda, Uttar Pradesh. He wrote poetry in Hindi, highlighting the plight of marginalized castes, Dalits, impoverished people. Born in a poor farmer family, However, they had considerable arable land. Gondvi's poetry was known for social commentary, scathing view of corrupt politicians and revolutionary in nature.

In 1998, Madhya Pradesh government awarded him with Dushyant Kumar Prize. In 2007 he was awarded Maati Ratan Samman by Shaheed Shodha Sansthan for his contributions to Awadhi/Hindi. 

Gondvi died on 18 December 2011 in Sanjay Gandhi Postgraduate Institute of Medical Sciences, Lucknow due to stomach ailments.

His poetry collections Dharti Ki Satah Par (Surface of the earth) and Samay Se Muthbhed (Encounter with time) are quite popular.

Some of his well-known poems are -

References

Hindi-language poets
Indian male poets
20th-century Indian poets
People from Uttar Pradesh
2011 deaths
1947 births
People from Gonda, Uttar Pradesh
20th-century Indian male writers
Adam Gondvi Kavita/Ghazal/Poetry (Hindi)